The F-side is a Dutch football hooligan group associated with AFC Ajax. The name came from the stand in Ajax' former stadium De Meer Vak F.

Background 
The F-side was founded in 1976. The biggest rivalry was between the F-side and Vak S of Feyenoord. The F-side has also many clashes with the North Side of ADO Den Haag and the Bunnikside of FC Utrecht. After the infamous Staafincident ( Iron bar incident ) in 1989 Ajax took measures. After a very high fence was installed in front of the F-side's traditional seating in Vak F, the F-side decided to move to Vak M, next to the stand for away supporters. Other supporters from other cities in the Netherlands came to use the old F-side stand. The old F-siders came mainly from Amsterdam. In the F-side there were now two groups - the old and the new generation.

The Battle of Beverwijk 

On March 23, 1997 the F-Side boys met with Feyenoord hooligans on a freeway outside Amsterdam in Beverwijk and the violence which followed has been come to be known as the Battle of Beverwijk.  Feyenoord and Ajax had not played that day. During the battle Carlo(s) Picornie, an F-Side top boy, was killed and several other people were seriously injured. According to some it was a miracle that "just" one man was killed. The fighting only lasted about five minutes. When the police arrived, the fighting had already stopped and no arrests were made. Feyenoord fans came armed with bats, chains, bottles, Molotov cocktails, and tasers, many of which were seized by police after the battle.  The death of Picornie is still fresh in the minds of Ajax fans and, to this day, his seat is left unoccupied at the stadium in remembrance of his murder.

Amsterdam Arena 

In 1996 Ajax moved to a new stadium: the Amsterdam Arena. The Ajax board decided to spread the members of the F-side in the stadium. The F-side made an agreement with the Ajax board to give the F-side a stand in the south side of the stadium (old and new generations on the same stand). In 2009 another Ajax hooligan group called (Ultras) VAK410 was moved from the north side of the Arena to the south side above the F-side. VAK410 and the F-side dominate a large area on the south side of the stadium.

Because the hooligan problem in the Netherlands was a big problem, the government decided to make a combi arrangement. The away supporters can only come to the game by train (or by bus) from their city to the other stadium. There is also a chopper above the train the whole rail track. Nearby the other stadium the away supporters go from the (separate) rail station in a tube to the away stand. In spite of this the games AFC Ajax - Feyenoord, Feyenoord - Ajax, Ajax - ADO Den Haag and ADO Den Haag - Ajax are played without away supporters because there is always trouble and there is an enormous police force power needed.

In the last few years, the F-side has become less active. The most of the original members are no longer active as hooligans and because the F-side is nowedays not the only "hardcore group" of Ajax (the hooligans of Ajax also includes members from VAK410 and other groups). The F-side (and the other Ajax groups) use to name A.F.C.A (hooligans) to identify themself as the Ajax hooligans. Nevertheless the influence of the F-side is considered one of the strongest among the Ajax hooligans.

Judaism 

Ajax is popularly seen as having "Jewish roots" and in the 1970s supporters of rival teams began taunting Ajax fans by calling them Jews. Ajax fans (few of whom are Jewish) responded by embracing Ajax's "Jewish" identity: calling themselves "super Jews", chanting "Joden, Joden" (Jews, Jews) at games, and adopting Jewish symbols such as the Star of David and the Israeli flag. This Jewish imagery eventually became a central part of Ajax fans' culture. At one point ringtones of "Hava Nagila", a Hebrew folk song, could be downloaded from the club's official website. Beginning in the 1980s, fans of Ajax's rivals escalated their antisemitic rhetoric, chanting slogans like "Hamas, Hamas/Jews to the gas" ("Hamas, hamas, joden aan het gas"), hissing to imitate the flow of gas, giving Nazi salutes, etc. The eventual result was that many Jewish Ajax fans stopped going to games. In the 2000s the club began trying to persuade fans to drop their Jewish image, but did not achieve success in this pursuit. Supporters, on and off the field, still employ imagery associated with Jewish history and the Israeli nation. Tottenham Hotspur's Yid Army use similar symbols.

See also 
 Sven Westendorp
 VAK410
 South Crew
 North Up Alliance
 Barra Brava
 Casual (subculture)
 Curva
 Hooliganism
 List of hooligan firms
 Major football rivalries
 Torcida
 Ultras

References

External links
 

AFC Ajax
Association football hooligan firms
Gangs in the Netherlands
1976 establishments in the Netherlands